The Tri-Series in Bangladesh in 2009–10 was a One Day International cricket tournament for the Idea Cup which was held in Bangladesh from 4 January to 13 January 2010. The tournament involved the national teams of India, Sri Lanka and Bangladesh. The tournament was won by Sri Lanka who defeated India in the final match which was held on 13 January 2010.

Background
India: Indian team's key batsman Sachin Tendulkar opted out of the tournament in order to rest for the tests against Bangladesh which are scheduled to be held after this tournament. Tendulkar will be replaced by Rohit Sharma in the 16-man squad. The fast bowlers Ishant Sharma and Praveen Kumar have been dropped and replaced by Sreesanth and Ashok Dinda and spinner Pragyan Ojha has been replaced by Amit Mishra.

Sri Lanka: Sri Lanka made various changes to its side due to the poor performance of players such as Sanath Jayasuriya, Chamara Kapugedera, Lasith Malinga and Ajantha Mendis in the recently concluded tour of India and injuries to players namely Mahela Jayawardene, Angelo Mathews and bowlers Muttiah Muralitharan and Dilhara Fernando. However Tillakaratne Dilshan suffered a groin injury in the first match against Bangladesh and missed the two successive matches of the tournament. Other players who suffered injuries were, Chamara Silva who fractured his thumb during the training and Muthumudalige Pushpakumara who injured his shoulder in the second match of the tournament against India. To fill the void in the squad, Sri Lanka brought Mahela Jayawardene, Dinesh Chandimal and Mahela Udawatte into the team.

Bangladesh: Bangladesh went into the tournament without their fast bowler, Mashrafe Mortaza who failed to recover from his knee injury. The Bangladeshi squad also featured two former ICL players, opener Shahriar Nafees and batsman Aftab Ahmed. The squad also featured an uncapped player, Shafiul Islam who is a fast bowler. Just before the start of the tournament Bangladesh fast bowler Nazmul Hossain was ruled out of the tri-series because of his injury and was replaced by Shahadat Hossain in the squad.

Squads

Matches

Group stage

Final

Tournament statistics

Team

Highest totals

Batting

Most runs in the tournament

Highest individual scores

Highest partnerships of the tournament

Bowling

Most wickets in the tournament

Fielding

Most catches in the tournament

Wicket-keeping

Most dismissals in the tournament

Media coverage

Television
NEO Cricket (live) - India, Hong Kong, Japan, Taiwan, Korea, Sri Lanka and Bangladesh
Doordarshan (live) - India's matches only
Zee Sports (live) - United States of America
Commonwealth Broadcasting Network (live)  - Canada
Fox Sports (live) - Australia
Sky Sports (live) - United Kingdom
Supersport (live) – South Africa, Kenya and Zimbabwe
Eurosport (live) - Europe
StarHub (pay per view) - Malaysia and Singapore

Online
Espn360.com (Free) - USA

References

External links
 Tri-Nation Tournament in Bangladesh 2009/10

International cricket competitions in 2009–10
2009-10
2010 in Bangladeshi sport